This is a list of notable people associated with Bob Jones University, located in the American city of Greenville, South Carolina.

Notable graduates

Michael P. V. Barrett, academic dean, Puritan Reformed Theological Seminary (former president, Geneva Reformed Seminary)
Cliff Barrows, long-time music and program director for the Billy Graham Evangelistic Association
Matt Baumgardner, artist
Ernest T. Campbell, senior pastor, Riverside Church, 1968-1976
Alan Cropsey, Michigan state senator
Gordon Denlinger, Pennsylvania state representative
Matthew Diffee, New Yorker cartoonist
Raymond Bryan Dillard, Old Testament scholar
Ed Dobson, associate of Jerry Falwell, pastor, evangelical author
Stuart Epperson, co-founder and chairman of Salem Communications and a member of the conservative Council for National Policy
Dan Forrest, composer
Chad Frye, cartoonist and illustrator
Mark M. Gillen, Pennsylvania state representative
David Gustafson, judge, United States Tax Court
Dan Hamilton (politician), member of South Carolina House of Representatives 
Ron Hamilton, composer, singer, and writer of the Patch the Pirate series for Majesty Music
Terry Haskins, Speaker Pro Tempore, South Carolina House of Representatives
Ken Hay, founder of The Wilds Christian camps
Dayton Hobbs, pastor, pioneer Christian school administrator, putative inventor of Tee Ball
Arlin Horton, founder of Pensacola Christian College, Pensacola, Florida
Rand Hummel, director of The Wilds of New England
Asa Hutchinson, former U.S. Representative and Under-Secretary for Border & Transportation Security, Department of Homeland Security, 46th Governor of Arkansas
Tim Hutchinson, pastor, former U.S. Representative and U.S. Senator from Arkansas
Homer Kent, New Testament scholar, former president of Grace Theological Seminary
Billy Kim, past president, Baptist World Alliance
Tim LaHaye, best-selling author of eschatological fiction
Eugene Merrill, Distinguished Professor Emeritus of Old Testament Studies, Dallas Theological Seminary; past president of Evangelical Theological Society
Virginia Mollenkott, specialist in feminist theology and lesbian, gay, bisexual and transgender theology 
Adam Morgan, composer, member of South Carolina House of Representatives 
Wendy Nanney, member of South Carolina House of Representatives 
Les Ollila, evangelist, second president of Northland Baptist Bible College
Rhonda Paisley, artist, author; former Ulster politician; daughter of Ian Paisley
Monroe Parker, evangelist
James R. Payton, church historian
Steve Pettit, evangelist, fifth president of BJU
Ernest Pickering, pastor; author; president of Baptist Bible College, Clarks Summit, Pennsylvania, and Central Baptist Theological Seminary, Minnesota
Robert L. Reymond, Reformed theologian and author
Haddon Robinson, president of Denver Seminary and Gordon-Conwell Theological Seminary
Sam Rohrer, Pennsylvania state representative
Peter Ruckman, Baptist minister, writer, and founder of Pensacola Baptist Institute; leading proponent of one of the most extreme "KJV-only" positions; outspoken critic of BJU
Joel Salatin, organic farmer and author; owner of Polyface Farm, featured in Michael Pollan's Omnivore's Dilemma
Moisés Silva, authority on biblical hermeneutics; past president of the Evangelical Theological Society
Ryan Silvey, member, Missouri House of Representatives
Bryan Simonaire, Maryland state senator
Richard Stratton, former president, Clearwater Christian College, Clearwater, Florida
Paul E. Toms, president, National Association of Evangelicals, chairman of World Relief.
Danny Verdin, South Carolina state senator
Ellen Weaver, South Carolina Superintendent of Education
Robert E. Webber, theologian, author of more than 40 books on worship, liturgy, and the early church

Notable faculty and staff
Carl Blair (1932-2018), painter and sculptor
Emery Bopp (1924-2007), painter and sculptor; chair, Division of Art, 1953-92
Walter Fremont (1924-2007), Dean of the School of Education, professionalized BJU's education curriculum; leader in the Christian school movement; namesake of the university's fitness center
Dwight Gustafson (1930-2014), conductor and composer; assumed the position of acting dean of the BJU School of Fine Arts in 1954, when he was 24 years old, and served as dean for forty years; known for writing and arranging more than 160 musical compositions; namesake of Dwight Gustafson Fine Arts Center
Eunice Hutto Morelock (1904-1947), mathematics professor; one of the first female academic deans of a coeducational college in the US; namesake of a wing of the Bob Jones Academy quadrangle
Robert Kirthwood "Lefty" Johnson (1910-1971), University business manager from 1935 until his death; namesake of a  residence hall
Darell Koons (1924-2016), painter
Laurence Morton (1924-2002), chairman of the BJU piano department for more than forty years
Robert N. Schaper (1922-2007), evangelical theologian, resigned from the BJU faculty in 1952 and completed his academic career at Fuller Theological Seminary
Katherine Corne Stenholm (1917-2015), founding director of the University's Unusual Films studio; one of the first women film directors in America; keynote speaker at the Cannes Film Festival, 1958
Jamie Langston Turner (b. 1949), novelist; her novel A Garden to Keep won 2002 Christy Award; her Winter Birds was named one of the "one hundred best books" of 2006 by Publishers Weekly

Notable honorary degree recipients
John Ashcroft, Attorney General of the United States (1999)
David Beasley, governor of South Carolina (1999)
W. E. Biederwolf, evangelist (1931)
Chiang Kai-shek, head of state of the Chinese Nationalist government
Madame Chiang Kai-shek (1952)
Frank G. Clement, governor of Tennessee (1956)
Percy Crawford, evangelist, founder of The King's College (1940)
James Parker Dees, founder and first bishop of the Anglican Orthodox Church (1965)
Vic Eliason, founder of VCY America (2001)
Theodore Epp, founder, Back to the Bible radio broadcast (1955)
Billy Graham, evangelist  (1948)
Lindsey Graham, U.S. Senator, South Carolina (1999)
Trey Gowdy, U.S. Representative, South Carolina, 4th District (2017)
Mordecai Ham, evangelist and prohibitionist (1935)
Jesse Helms, U.S. Senator, North Carolina (1976)
Richmond Pearson Hobson, admiral, congressman from Georgia, Medal of Honor recipient, temperance crusader (1935)
William Henry Houghton, fourth president of Moody Bible Institute (1942)
Bob Inglis, U. S. Representative, South Carolina (1995)
Harry A. Ironside, Bible teacher, author, pastor of Moody Memorial Church, Chicago (1941)
Olin Johnston, U.S. Senator, South Carolina (1948)
Robert T. Ketcham, founder of General Association of Regular Baptist Churches (1961)
B.R. Lakin, Baptist evangelist (1949)
Lester Maddox, staunch segregationist, governor of Georgia (1969)
Ernest Manning, premier of Alberta (1947)
Carl McIntire, radio preacher; founder of Bible Presbyterian Church (1953)
Henry Morris, a founder of the young-earth creationist movement (1966)
Harold J. Ockenga, pastor of Park Street Congregational Church, Boston, Massachusetts; later, a leader in the "neo-evangelical" movement opposed by BJU (1944)
Ian Paisley, founder and moderator of the Free Presbyterian Church of Ulster; future leader of the Democratic Unionist Party, First Minister of Northern Ireland (1966) and spiritual leader of Loyalist terrorist groups(UDA, UVF).
John R. Rice, evangelist and founder of The Sword of the Lord (1945)
Homer Rodeheaver, music evangelist, pioneer gospel music publisher (1942)
Tim Scott, U.S. senator (2018)
Charles Stevens, founder and first president of Piedmont Baptist College (1958)
Billy Sunday, evangelist (1935)
Helen "Nell" (Mrs. Billy) Sunday, evangelist (1940)
Strom Thurmond, U.S. Senator, South Carolina (1948)
Mel Trotter, rescue mission founder, Bible conference speaker (1935)
George Wallace, governor of Alabama (1964)

Notable benefactors
W. J. Barge (1898-1968), founding member of the American Board of Abdominal Surgeons and president of the Miami Christian Businessman's Committee.  Barge Memorial Hospital, the University's infirmary, was dedicated in his memory in 1968.
David D. Davis (1917-2002), founder, of D.D. Davis Construction Co., Youngstown, Ohio; philanthropist; member of BJU Board of Trustees for 31 years; namesake (with his wife, Velma) of The Davis Field House and two buildings in Youngstown
Bibb Graves, two-term governor of Alabama (1927—31, 1935–39).  Although Graves was Exalted Cyclops (chapter president) of the Montgomery branch of the Ku Klux Klan when he was first elected governor, he was also a progressive who sought to improve public education in Alabama. Graves served as a member of the board of trustees of Bob Jones College and a BJU residence hall was named for him until 2011.
Lillian R. Howell (1876-1958), native of Bridgeport, Connecticut; although she never visited the campus nor met any of the Joneses, at her death, she left the bulk of her estate to BJU.  The Howell Memorial Science Building is named in her honor.
John Sephus Mack (1880-1940), early twentieth century entrepreneur who (with Walter C. Shaw) created G.C. Murphy Stores, a regional chain of more than two hundred "five and dimes" headquartered in McKeesport, PA. Mack was a significant contributor to Bob Jones College during the Depression—when Murphy Stores were actually expanding—and he underwrote major building projects on the Cleveland campus.  Mack also gave business advice to Bob Jones, Sr. and "Lefty" Johnson before his death in 1940. The BJU library is named for him and a residence hall for his wife.
Robert Lee McKenzie (1870-1956), developer and first mayor of Panama City, Florida.  The college charter was signed in the office/library of his home, which is listed on the National Register of Historic Places.  The Dixon-McKenzie Dining Common is named in honor of him, his wife, and his sister-in-law, Mary Elizabeth Dixon.
Agnes Moorehead, actress of Bewitched fame, willed her Ohio estate to BJU. Moorehead's father was a Presbyterian minister, and in 1921, when Agnes Moorehead was an undergraduate at Muskingum College, New Concord, Ohio—a Presbyterian school founded by her uncle—the college presented an honorary degree to Bob Jones, Sr.
James Y. Smith (1874-1953), owner of Smith Cafeteria, South Bend, Indiana; a chance meeting with Bob Jones, Sr. led to a friendship and increasing financial contributions to BJU; namesake of a residence hall

Notable former students (non-graduates)

Billy Graham, evangelist, attended one semester
Katherine Helmond, actress, attended one year and had role in Unusual Films' Wine of Morning (1955) 
John F. MacArthur, radio preacher; pastor, Grace Community Church, Sun Valley, California; president of The Master's College; attended two years
Fred Phelps, pastor of Westboro Baptist Church; known for "God Hates Fags" website and public protests; his association with the school ended abruptly after three semesters; once claimed he left because of opposition to the school's racial policies and later denied that he had ever attended
Charles D. Provan; his Bible and Birth Control provides a theological justification for Quiverfull; attended two years
Chris Sligh, American Idol finalist during season 6; attended three and a half years

See also

References

Bob Jones University people